Princeton is a city in Mille Lacs and Sherburne counties in the U.S. state of Minnesota, at the junction of the Rum River and its West branch. It is 50 miles north of Minneapolis and 30 miles east of St. Cloud, at the intersection of Highways 169 and 95. The population was 4,819 at the 2020 census. A majority of its residents live in Mille Lacs County.

History
In the winter of 1855 Samuel Ross, Jame W. Gillian, Dorilus Morrison, John S. Prince and Richard Chute platted the town of Princeton. The plat was officially recorded on April 19, 1856.

Lumbering
Princeton's location near the junction of the Rum River and its West branch was critical to the town's development. In 1847, Daniel Stanchfield led an expedition to explore the Rum River. The group discovered vast white pine forests upstream from Princeton's future site along the Rum River, the West Branch Rum River, and their tributaries. Three sawmills were built in Princeton between 1856 and 1867. Lumbermen floated logs down the Rum River to the Princeton mills, though most of the logs passed through Princeton to mills in Minneapolis.

Brickmaking
Brick-making was another important industry in the Princeton area. The industry developed about two miles northeast of Princeton near beds of clay. A community known as Brickton formed in the location. From 1889 through the late 1920s several brickyards operated in Brickton, collectively producing as many as 20 million bricks per year. When the brick industry declined, Brickton ceased to exist. “Years after the last brick had been shipped from Brickton, specifications in contracts for construction of public buildings often stated that it should be of Princeton brick or of equally good quality.”

Other
Other important industries in Princeton's early years included: wheat farming (before potatoes became primary), potato farming, starch production, dairy, and distilled spirits production, in which the town's distillery continues to play a key role.

The Princeton Farmers Market has been a seasonal mainstay since 1988.

Geography

Demographics

2010 census
As of the census of 2010, there were 4,698 people, 1,926 households, and 1,176 families living in the city. The racial makeup of the city was 96.5% White, 0.4% African American, 0.7% Native American, 0.3% Asian, 0.2% from other races, and 2.0% from two or more races. Hispanic or Latino of any race were 1.7% of the population.

There were 1,926 households, of which 31.7% had children under the age of 18 living with them, 41.1% were married couples living together, 14.6% had a female householder with no husband present, 5.3% had a male householder with no wife present, and 38.9% were non-families. 32.3% of all households were made up of individuals, and 16.2% had someone living alone who was 65 years of age or older. The average household size was 2.35 and the average family size was 2.92.

The median age in the city was 38.7 years. 24.5% of residents were under the age of 18; 8.5% were between the ages of 18 and 24; 24.9% were from 25 to 44; 22.7% were from 45 to 64; and 19.4% were 65 years of age or older. The gender makeup of the city was 46.7% male and 53.3% female.

2000 census
As of the census of 2000, there were 3,933 people, 1,624 households, and 998 families living in the city. The racial makeup of the city was 98.27% White, 0.13% African American, 0.38% Native American, 0.28% Asian, 0.03% Pacific Islander, 0.36% from other races, and 0.56% from two or more races. Hispanic or Latino of any race were 0.89% of the population.

There were 1,624 households, out of which 31.2% had children under the age of 18 living with them, 43.8% were married couples living together, 13.6% had a female householder with no husband present, and 38.5% were non-families. 33.0% of all households were made up of individuals, and 17.2% had someone living alone who was 65 years of age or older.  The average household size was 2.33 and the average family size was 2.95.

In the city, the population was spread out, with 25.4% under the age of 18, 9.3% from 18 to 24, 26.8% from 25 to 44, 19.2% from 45 to 64, and 19.4% who were 65 years of age or older.  The median age was 37 years. For every 100 females, there were 83.3 males.  For every 100 females age 18 and over, there were 79.5 males.

The median income for a household in the city was $35,216, and the median income for a family was $42,558. Males had a median income of $31,684 versus $22,009 for females. The per capita income for the city was $18,381.  About 2.7% of families and 6.7% of the population were below the poverty line, including 5.7% of those under age 18 and 12.8% of those age 65 or over.

Notable people

Bob Backlund, former World Wrestling Federation champion wrestler
Jared Berggren, Professional basketball player, former Wisconsin Badgers men's basketball player
Fay Cravens, Minnesota legislator and newspaper editor
Charles R,. Davis, Minnesota legislator and educator
Kurt Daudt, Speaker of the Minnesota House of Representatives
Robert C. Dunn, Minnesota legislator and newspaper editor
Robert G. Dunn, Minnesota legislator and building contractor
Rod Grams, United States Senator from Minnesota
Clarence C. Mitchell, Minnesota legislator and lawyer
Robert J. Odegard, Minnesota state representative
Jerome P. Peterson, Minnesota legislator and educator

"Coke Geysers" world record attempt
The Princeton High School Student Council organized a community effort to break the world record for simultaneously erupting coke geysers on May 27, 2011. The record of 2,854 bottles was set in October 2010 in the Philippines. Hundreds of students participated, with a goal of setting off a series of 3,000 geysers, a figure they exceeded with 3,051 total simultaneous eruptions. But Guinness World Records personnel did not officiate the event and never made the record official. Students say the idea grew from a plan for a graduation prank into a way to put their small town on the map. A video of the attempt was broadcast on Minnesota NBC News affiliate KARE 11 and edited by a YouTube user named Physics314Nerd.

Infrastructure

Transportation
Princeton is served by the Princeton Municipal Airport.

Major highways
The following routes are located within the city of Princeton:

  U.S. Highway 169
  Minnesota State Highway 95

References

External links

 City of Princeton, Minnesota website
 City-Data.com
 ePodunk: Profile for Princeton, Minnesota

Cities in Minnesota
Cities in Mille Lacs County, Minnesota
Cities in Sherburne County, Minnesota